Oktyabrsky is a rural locality (a settlement) in Pochepsky District, Bryansk Oblast, Russia. The population was 240 as of 2010. There are 5 streets.

Geography 
Oktyabrsky is located 32 km southwest of Pochep (the district's administrative centre) by road. Mostishche is the nearest rural locality.

References 

Rural localities in Pochepsky District